Mount Carmel is a coastal mountain range in northern Israel.

Mount Carmel may refer also to:

Places in the United States
 Mount Carmel, Hamden, a neighborhood of Hamden, Connecticut
 Mount Carmel, Florida
 Mount Carmel, Illinois, a city and county seat
 Mount Carmel, Indiana, Franklin County, a town
 Mount Carmel, Washington County, Indiana, an unincorporated community
 Mount Carmel, Kentucky, an unincorporated community
 Mount Carmel, Mississippi
 Mount Carmel, a township and community in Cavalier County, North Dakota
 Mount Carmel, Ohio, a census-designated place
 Mount Carmel, Pennsylvania, a borough
 Mount Carmel, Saskatchewan, a hamlet in Canada
 Mount Carmel, South Carolina, a census-designated place
 Mount Carmel, Tennessee, a town
 Mount Carmel, Utah, now part of Orderville
 Mount Carmel Junction, Utah, now part of Orderville
 Mount Carmel, West Virginia, an unincorporated community
 Mount Carmel District, a neighborhood of Poughkeepsie, New York
 Mount Carmel Precinct, Wabash County, Illinois

Health care
 Mount Carmel Health System, in Ohio, U.S.
 Mount Carmel Community Hospital, in Dublin, Ireland
 Mount Carmel Medical Group, a health care organization in Ireland
 Mt. Carmel Regional Medical Center, a hospital in Pittsburg, Kansas, U.S.

Other
 Mount Carmel Catholic College for Girls, a Catholic specialist secondary school in London
 Mount Carmel Cemetery (Hillside, Illinois), near Chicago, Illinois
 Mount Carmel Center, a home of the Branch Davidians in Waco, Texas
 Mount Carmel Shrine (Saskatchewan)
 Mount Carmel, also known as Sleeping Giant, a small mountain in Connecticut
 Mount Carmel or Karmilio Oros, a peak at the southern end of the Athos peninsula in Greece

See also
 Mount Carmel High School (disambiguation)
 Mount Carmel College (disambiguation)
 Mount Carmel, Ontario (disambiguation)
 Our Lady of Mount Carmel (disambiguation)

zh:旋磁共振